John Thomas "Jack" McCashney (born 31 May 1932) is an Australian rules footballer who played with  in the Victorian Football League (VFL).

McCashney was born in Trentham, Victoria, the fourth child of Thomas McCashney and Bessie Marshall Hodgkins. He is the nephew of John, Frank and Jim McCashney and commenced his football career playing with the Trentham and Kyneton Football Clubs.

He married Marie Norma Foster in 1960 and they had four children. They lived in Ballarat before retiring to live in Echuca.

Notes

External links 

1932 births
Australian rules footballers from Victoria (Australia)
Hawthorn Football Club players
Living people